Cesare Nava (1861–1933) was an Italian engineer and politician who served as the minister of national economy between 1924 and 1925 in the cabinet of Benito Mussolini.

Early life and education
Nava was born in Milan on 7 October 1861 to Leonardo, a merchant, and Maria Bettali. Coming from a family of the Milanese petty bourgeoisie, he first attended the Regio Istituto Tecnico Santa Marta where he received a physical-mathematical license in 1879. Then he attended the Higher Technical Institute of Milan, Milan Polytechnic, and obtained a degree in engineering in 1884.

Career
In 1884 Nava was named the president of a local Catholic youth organization named Lombard Catholic movement attached to the Italian Catholic Youth Society. In 1886 he participated in the establishment of the newspaper La Lega lombarda which called for the political participation of Catholics alongside the moderates Nava joined the city council of Milan in 1893 and was then elected to its general administration in 1895. He was elected director of the Banco Ambrosiano on 22 December 1897 replacing Giuseppe Tovini, its founder and president, in the post. On 18 January 1898, his term was extended, and he held the post until 1933. 

Nava was re-elected to the city council of Milan in 1908. In the following year he ran for the Chamber of Deputies and won the seat. He was elected a second time to the Chamber in 1913. In October 1917, he and other Catholic deputies withdrew their support for the government led by Prime Minister Paolo Boselli due to the statements of the Foreign Minister Sidney Sonnino in regard to the liquidation of the papal note dated 1 August calling for the cessation of World War I. 

In May 1918 he was appointed by Prime Minister Vittorio Emanuele Orlando first as undersecretary and then general commissioner for the Ministry of Arms and Ammunition which he held until 15 September. Following World War I he joined the Italian People's Party. On 23 June 1919, Nava was made the minister for the lands freed from the enemy in the cabinet led by Francesco Saverio Nitti. In November 1919 Nava was again elected to the Chamber of Deputies on the PPI list representing Milan. Nava's term as the minister for the lands freed from the enemy ended on 13 March 1920.

Nava became a senator on 8 June 1921. He left the Italian People's Party in April 1924. He was appointed minister of national economy to the cabinet of Benito Mussolini on 1 July 1924. Nava replaced Orso Mario Corbino in the post. Nava's tenure was brief and lasted until 10 July 1925 when Mussolini requested his and Alberto De Stefani's resignations. Giuseppe Belluzzo replaced Nava as minister of national economy.

In 1929 he joined the National Fascist Party and continued to serve at the Senate. Following his retirement from politics Nava became president of the Milanese Union, a pro-fascist Catholic association adhering to the Italian National Center. On 9 October 1933 he resigned from the presidency of the Fabbrica del duomo in Milan for health reasons.

Personal life and death
Widowed by his first wife, Giuseppa Prina, on 27 November 1895 Nava married Maria Cesa Bianchi, daughter of the well-known architect Paolo Bianchi. He had two children. Nava died in Milan on 27 November 1933.

Awards
Nava was awarded numerous honors, including the Order of the Crown of Italy (four times) and the Order of Saints Maurice and Lazarus (two times).

References

External links

19th-century Italian engineers
20th-century Italian engineers
1861 births
1933 deaths
Government ministers of Italy
Italian male journalists
Italian newspaper founders
Italian People's Party (1919) politicians
National Fascist Party politicians
Mussolini Cabinet
Politicians from Milan
Polytechnic University of Milan alumni
Recipients of the Order of Saints Maurice and Lazarus
Members of the Senate of the Kingdom of Italy
19th-century Italian journalists
Italian Roman Catholics